Larry B. Scott  is an American actor whose film debut was in the 1978 movie A Hero Ain't Nothin' But a Sandwich. He played Gerald LeFlore in the 1978 movie One in a Million: The Ron LeFlore Story. He is best known for playing Lamar Latrelle, the openly gay fraternity member in the Revenge of the Nerds series of comedy films from 1984 to 1994.

In the 1986 film SpaceCamp he played opposite a young Joaquin Phoenix as the character Rudy Tyler. In Fear of a Black Hat, he played Tasty-Taste, a pastiche of rappers Flavor Flav and Eazy-E. Scott also makes an appearance in The Karate Kid and is one of the first competitors to lose to Daniel LaRusso in the film's finale.  He also appeared in the movie Iron Eagle. He then co-starred in Extreme Prejudice directed by Walter Hill. He played a role in the S.E. Hinton adaptation That Was Then... This Is Now, alongside Emilio Estevez.

Scott has also made appearances in several television sitcoms, including Barney Miller, The Jeffersons, Seinfeld, St. Elsewhere, Magnum P.I. and Martin along with the television movie Roll of Thunder, Hear My Cry, and he starred as tech genius F.X. Spinner on the sci-fi action adventure series Super Force for two seasons. He was also the voice of the Paladin in the game Diablo II.

He operates the acting studio W.I.T. (Whatever It Takes) Filmwerks.

References

External links
 

African-American male actors
American male film actors
American male television actors
Living people
21st-century African-American people
20th-century African-American people
Year of birth missing (living people)